Constance Mary Pott (1862–1957) was an English printmaker, writer, and teacher active during the late nineteenth century and the twentieth century. She worked in close proximity to the teacher and printmaker Frank Short.

Biography
Pott was born in England in 1862 and she grew up in a Victorian upper-middle-class home with her mother, Mrs. Henry Pott that wrote the book Quite the Gentleman. During the middle of the nineteenth century, the demand for artisans rose as the industrial sector began to grow. The need for artists and craftsmen spurred the creation of training schools. Constance Mary Pott attended the Royal College of Art. Pott, like many of the other students attending the school, was more drawn to fine art rather than design and she took an engraving class which began her art career.

Pott's professional relationship with the artist Sir Frank Short began during her time at the RCA when he taught the engraving class in 1891. Shortly after graduating Pott herself began teaching at the RCA in 1902 and was extolled as an excellent teacher by many critics and curators of the time. She never married, and she didn't have any children, but she managed to outlive many of her peers.

She eventually died in 1957 and left the majority of her belongings to her two sisters and her money to Johannes Matthias Daum, a former student of hers from the Royal College of Art.

Legacy
The book Etched in Memory: The Building and Survival of Artistic Reputation includes many records of women artists between 1880 and 1930. The book surveys the etching revival and provides explanations as to why women had a harder time of building a reputation and ensuring the survival of their reputation when compared to their male contemporaries. Constance Mary Pott is analyzed in the book, and the authors contribute her lack of recognition was due to a few different reasons. Pott had a very Victorian upbringing, in which self-promotion was discouraged, so Pott wasn't able to exploit her artwork as much as her male counterparts. In December 1885 she organised the first meeting of the  Francis Bacon Society having been impressed by her own earlier discoveries. She had been working on deciphering Elizabethan handwriting found in Fancis Bacon's private wastebook, and found that several ideas and figures of speech from the Promus could also be found in the Shakespeare plays and concluded that Sir Francis Bacon was their secret author. Pott outlived many of her peers and lived 32 years past the peak demand for etching artists, so when she died, her artwork was no longer related to the art scene at the time. Constance Mary Pott also neglected to keep a record of her artwork, so historians had a difficult time keeping track of the prints she made. Lastly, Pott never had any children, so her family couldn't pass on her legacy as an important artist of the time.

References

1862 births
1957 deaths
20th-century printmakers
20th-century British women artists
Alumni of the Royal College of Art